In espionage, a confusion agent is an individual who is dispatched for the primary purpose
of confounding the intelligence or counterintelligence apparatus of another country, rather than for the purpose of collecting and transmitting information. Such an individual may provide misleading information, among other confusion tactics.

References

Counterintelligence